The 1960 Copa del Generalísimo Juvenil was the tenth staging of the tournament. The competition began on May 15, 1960, and ended on June 26, 1960, with the final.

First round

|}

Quarterfinals

|}

Semifinals

|}

Final

|}

Copa del Rey Juvenil de Fútbol
Juvenil